Rush Township is one of the twenty-two townships of Tuscarawas County, Ohio, United States.  The 2000 census found 887 people in the township.

Geography
Located in the southeastern part of the county, it borders the following townships:
Mill Township - north
Franklin Township, Harrison County - east
Washington Township, Harrison County - southeast
Perry Township - south
Washington Township - southwest corner
Clay Township - west
Warwick Township - northwest

Part of the village of Gnadenhutten is located in northwestern Rush Township, and the unincorporated community of Stillwater lies in the eastern part of the township.

Name and history
Statewide, other Rush Townships are located in Champaign and Scioto counties.

Government
The township is governed by a three-member board of trustees, who are elected in November of odd-numbered years to a four-year term beginning on the following January 1. Two are elected in the year after the presidential election and one is elected in the year before it. There is also an elected township fiscal officer, who serves a four-year term beginning on April 1 of the year after the election, which is held in November of the year before the presidential election. Vacancies in the fiscal officership or on the board of trustees are filled by the remaining trustees.  The current trustees are  Chad Poland, Fred Edwards, and Terry Grant, and the fiscal officer is Myron Armstrong.

References

External links
County website

Townships in Tuscarawas County, Ohio
Townships in Ohio